PNS Badr may refer to following ships of Pakistan Navy:

 , the former British  HMS Gabbard (D47) acquired by Pakistan in 1957 and scrapped in 1985.
 , the former United States  USS Julius A. Furer (FFG-6) acquired by Pakistan in 1989 and returned in 1993. She was scrapped in 1994.
 , the former British Type 21 frigate HMS Alacrity (F174) acquired by Pakistan in 1994.

Pakistan Navy ship names